Alpowa Summit (el. 2785 ft./849 m.) is a mountain pass in the state of Washington. The pass connects Pomeroy on the west with Clarkston on the east. The pass separates the Blue Mountains' foothills on the south with the rolling Palouse to the north.  The Washington State portion of U.S. Route 12 connects the cities of Lewiston, Idaho and Walla Walla, Washington by passing over this summit.

References

External links
 

Landforms of Garfield County, Washington
Mountain passes of Washington (state)
Transportation in Garfield County, Washington
U.S. Route 12